Plomosa is a populated place situated in La Paz County, Arizona, United States. The name is derived from the Spanish for "lead-colored", and also refers to the nearby Plomosa Mountains, which contain numerous lead-bearing mines.

References

Populated places in La Paz County, Arizona